Leland Clure Morton (February 20, 1916 – April 11, 1998) was a United States district judge of the United States District Court for the Middle District of Tennessee.

Education and career

Born in Knoxville, Tennessee, Morton received a Bachelor of Arts degree from the University of Tennessee in 1934 and a Juris Doctor from the University of Tennessee College of Law in 1936. He was in private practice in Knoxville from 1937 to 1941. He was an FBI special agent in Washington, D.C., from 1941 to 1945, thereafter returning to private practice in Knoxville, from 1946 to 1970.

Federal judicial service

On September 21, 1970, Morton was nominated by President Richard Nixon to a seat on the United States District Court for the Middle District of Tennessee vacated by Judge William Ernest Miller. Morton was confirmed by the United States Senate on October 8, 1970, and received his commission on October 14, 1970. He served as Chief Judge from 1977 to 1984, assuming senior status on July 31, 1984, and serving in that capacity until his death, on April 11, 1998, in Knoxville.

Honor

In 1996, the L. Clure Morton United States Post Office and Courthouse in Cookeville, Tennessee, was renamed in his honor.

References

Sources
 

1916 births
1998 deaths
Judges of the United States District Court for the Middle District of Tennessee
United States district court judges appointed by Richard Nixon
20th-century American judges
University of Tennessee alumni
University of Tennessee College of Law alumni
Federal Bureau of Investigation agents